The men's individual road race at the 1996 Summer Olympics in Atlanta, was held on July 31, 1996. There were 183 participants from 57 nations in the race over 221.85 km, with 116 cyclists finishing. For the first time, the event was open to professionals. The maximum number of cyclists per nation was five, up from three in previous editions of the event. The event was won by Pascal Richard of Switzerland, the nation's first victory in the men's individual road race and first medal in the event since a bronze in 1936. Rolf Sørensen earned Denmark's third medal in the event, silver just as in 1964 and 1968. Max Sciandri similarly matched Great Britain's best result: a bronze, as in 1896 and 1956.

Background

This was the 15th appearance of the event, previously held in 1896 and then at every Summer Olympics since 1936. It replaced the individual time trial event that had been held from 1912 to 1932; with the re-introduction of the time trial in Atlanta, this was the first time that both events were held at the same Games. The 1996 Games were also the first to allow top professional riders to compete; this also resulted in lengthening the distance of the course and increasing the number of riders per nation (to increase teamwork opportunity). There was no clear favorite in the race. Miguel Induráin of Spain was the most prominent cyclist competing, but his skills were far more suited to the time trial—in which he would take gold three days later.

Albania, Armenia, Belarus, the Czech Republic, Kazakhstan, Moldova, Oman, Russia, Slovakia, Ukraine, and Uzbekistan each made their debut in the men's individual road race. Great Britain made its 15th appearance in the event, the only nation to have competed in each appearance to date.

Competition format and course

The mass-start race was on a 221.85 kilometre course over the Buckhead Cycling Course in Atlanta. The distance had been increased from previous Olympic road races to be more consistent with professional races.

Schedule

All times are Eastern Daylight Time (UTC−4)

Results

A three-man breakout occurred with 33 kilometres to go, with Richard, Sørensen, and Sciandri getting clear o the peloton. The final sprint went to Richard. A second group of three formed as well, this time with the home-nation cyclist Andreu winning the sprint for fourth place.

References

Sources
 Official Report

R
Cycling at the Summer Olympics – Men's road race
Men's events at the 1996 Summer Olympics